The Pagani Huayra is a mid-engine sports car produced by Italian sports car manufacturer Pagani, succeeding the company's previous offering, the Zonda. It is named after Wind, like the previous model (Zonda), the word Huayra came from a Quechua which translates to the word for wind. And not related to Huayra Tata. The Huayra was named "The Hypercar of the Year 2012" by Top Gear magazine. On 11 February 2015 it was reported that the Pagani Huayra has been sold out. The Huayra was limited to just 100 units as part of Pagani's agreement with engine supplier Mercedes-AMG.

The Pagani Huayra was officially debuted online with several pictures in a press release on 25 January 2011. The official world debut was at the headquarters of Pirelli in Milan in February 2011.

Specifications

Using Pirelli tyres, the Pagani Huayra is capable of 1.66 g of lateral acceleration.

The Pagani Huayra uses a seven-speed sequential gearbox and a single disc clutch. As a result, the transmission weighs .

The car is equipped with Brembo brake calipers, rotors and pads. The calipers have four pistons in front and four in the rear.

The engine has been designed at the request of Pagani to reduce turbo lag and improve response, achieved with smaller turbochargers, a different intercooler configuration and re-programmed ECU settings.

Like many high-performance cars, the Huayra uses dry sump lubrication. This has several key benefits including guaranteeing oil flow even when the car is subjected to extreme lateral acceleration, preventing "oil surge" which allows the engine to operate more efficiently while the lack of an oil pan allows mounting the engine lower, lowering the car's center of gravity and improving handling.

A water / oil heat exchanger reduces engine warm-up times on cold days and helps maintain a stable temperature for refrigerants and lubricants.

To minimise the use of pipes and fittings (and the overall weight of the vehicle), the expansion tank is mounted directly on the engine. Intercooler fins act as an expansion tank circuit at low temperatures.

The titanium exhaust system was designed and built by MHG-Fahrzeugtechnik. Hydroformed joints were developed to reduce back pressure and ensure a free flow exhaust. Titanium reduces the weight of the exhaust system while the Inconel silencers improve reliability in the most exposed parts of the exhaust at high temperatures.

Aerodynamics 

The Pagani Huayra is different from its predecessor in that it incorporates active aerodynamics. It is capable of changing the height of the front from the ground and independently operating four flaps placed at the rear and front of the car. The behavior of the flaps is managed by a dedicated control unit that is fed information from systems such as the ABS and ECU, which pass on information about the car's speed, yaw rate, lateral acceleration, steering angle and throttle position. This is intended to achieve minimal drag coefficient or maximum downforce depending on the situation. The Huayra's designer Horacio Pagani states that it has a variable drag coefficient of between .31 and .37. The system also prevents excess body roll in the corners by raising the "inside" flaps (i.e. the left ones in a left-handed corner and vice versa), increasing the downforce on that side of the car. The rear flaps also act as an airbrake. Under hard braking, both the front suspension and the two rear flaps are raised to counter-act weight transfer to the front wheels and keep the whole car stable, for instance when entering a corner. Air from the radiator is extracted through an arch in the bonnet at an angle that is designed not to affect the streamline around the body. The side air intakes behind the front wheels create a low pressure zone, resulting in downforce.

Model variants

Huayra BC 
The Huayra BC is a track focused version of the Huayra which was unveiled at the 2016 Geneva Motor Show. The Huayra BC is named after the late Benny Caiola, a friend of Horacio Pagani, and the first Pagani customer. The Huayra BC has an improved version of the standard Huayra's 6.0 L twin-turbocharged V12 engine having a power output of  @5900 rpm
as well as  @ 2500-5600 rpm of torque. The Huayra BC comes with a lighter titanium exhaust system, new aluminum alloy wheels, and a stripped out interior. The tires are Pirelli P-Zero Corsas that feature 12 different rubber compounds, and the suspension and wishbones are made of aeronautical grade aluminum, known as Avional. The Huayra BC also has a new front bumper with a front splitter and winglets, deeper side skirts, and an air diffuser that stretches the entire width of the rear bumper with a large rear wing. The car could be ordered with an optional roof scoop. All of the exterior components in the car are used to optimize downforce and drag. The Huayra BC uses an Xtrac 7-speed sequential manual transmission. Pagani has stuck with a single-clutch gearbox because it weighs 40% less than double-clutch gearboxes. 

Pagani planned to make 20 units of the Huayra BC, which were all sold out. In reality, Pagani drastically overproduced the Huayra BC, producing 30 units instead of the promised 20, to the irritation of some owners.

Huayra Roadster 
After 2 years of development, the Huayra Roadster was officially unveiled at the 2017 Geneva Motor Show.

The over-all appearance of the car has changed, with the most obvious being the removable top (hence the Roadster name). This part of the vehicle is also its key element. The design of the rear is also different, with new eyelid-like fixed flaps that continue with the design and eventually end on the rear lights. The rear engine cover also has a new shape to adapt to the roadster form and now has vents for efficient cooling. The wheels are unique and specifically constructed for the car. The car has conventional doors instead of the Gull-wing doors of the coupé as they are impossible to fit on an open top car while maintaining the low weight.

All of this power is delivered to the rear wheels via a 7-speed automated manual transmission by Xtrac. The car now uses a hydraulic and electronic activation system with carbon synchronizers. Bosch has also contributed in the construction of the car and the car uses their ECU system. Only 100 will be made, all of which have already been sold. The tyre supplier is Pirelli, with P-Zero tyres. The tyre have a white narrow outline, resembling those of an F1 race car. Pagani has also used a new material for the Roadster called carbon triax, which is a tri-axis fiberglass meshed with carbon-fibre power bands.

Pagani states that the car produces  of downforce or 1.8 lateral G-force. However, this figure is unproven, but if true, Pagani will have set a new record.

Huayra Roadster BC
Introduced in July 2019, the Huayra Roadster BC, often mistakenly called the Huayra BC Roadster, is the track-oriented version of the Roadster. The 7-speed Xtrac sequential gearbox with single clutch used on the roadster is 35% lighter than a contemporary dual-clutch gearbox. It is  lighter than the Huayra Roadster . The monocoque of the Roadster BC is constructed of carbon-titanium HP62 material to keep weight low and make the construction rigid. The Roadster BC is claimed to generate  of downforce at  due to its large fixed rear wing and aerodynamic elements. In addition to movable active Aero elements, the titanium exhaust incorporates flaps in the catalytic converters to divert exhaust gases over the underfloor elements like a Formula 1 car's blown diffuser. Production of the Huayra Roadster BC will be limited to 40 units only.

Imola 

Introduced in February 2020, the Imola is named after the Autodromo Internazionale Enzo e Dino Ferrari (Imola Circuit), where it underwent 16,000km of high-speed testing. Exterior changes from the standard Huayra include a large seven-section diffuser, a large roof scoop, a shark fin, more pronounced side skirts and a wide fixed rear wing with an integrated stoplight. Six Imola were built: 5 for customers and 1 prototype for Horacio Pagani.

Huayra Tricolore
On December 16, 2020, Pagani introduced the Huayra Tricolore, was built to celebrate the 60th Anniversary of Frecce Tricolori, Italy's aerobatic team.
 
The Tricolore uses a twin-turbo 6.0-liter V12 engine sourced from Mercedes-AMG which has been tuned to produce 829 horsepower and 811 pound-feet of torque, which is 38bhp and 37lb ft more  than the power and torque produced by a standard Huayra BC engine. The car is only available in roadster form and shares much of the bodywork of the Roadster BC. It is unpainted except for a clear blue lacquer, and red, white, and green stripes from the nose along the top of the car's surface. Inside, the Tricolore is equipped with white and blue leather seats with Italian flag stripes, and the Tricolori logo is embroidered into the headrests. The Pitot tube mounted on the nose of the car, a metal measuring device that's typically uses on planes to measure air speed, is a unique feature of the Tricolore.

The production is limited to three customer units as its predecessor and priced at €5,500,000+taxes ($6.7 Million+taxes) each. In reality, there will be four Huayra Tricolore: 3 customer cars and 1 prototype owned by the company. The first two customer cars have been delivered, as of early 2022. One car went to a customer in Stuttgart, Germany, while another went to a customer in Wisconsin, USA (but delivered through Pagani of Dallas).

Huayra R 

Pagani plans a limited 30-car production run for the Huayra R, similar to the limited 15-car production run of the track-only version of the Pagani Zonda, the Zonda R.
It will cost €2.6mln + taxes (around $3.1mln + taxes).

Huayra Codalunga

On June 16, 2022, Pagani introduced the Huayra Codalunga, a 5 units limited version of the Huayra, to pay homage to the lines of racecars from the 1960s, like the Porsche 917 (Horacio's favorite car). Prices started at €7mln+tax (around $7.36mln+tax) with all 5 units being sold before its unveiling. This car was the result of a special project by Pagani Grandi Complicazioni.

Special editions

Lampo 

In December 2017, Pagani introduced the Huayra Lampo in partnership with Lapo Elkann of Garage Italia Customs. The car is inspired by the Fiat Turbina concept introduced in 1954. This particular Huayra gets the ‘Tempesta’ pack too: larger front openings, plus new aero elements on the front splitter and sills.

Gallery

See also 

 List of production cars by power output

Media

 A red and black Huayra appears in the film Transformers: Age of Extinction as a KSI-built Decepticon named Stinger.
 EA secured the exclusive video game rights to the Pagani Huayra in 2011, available exclusively in Need for Speed titles in 2011, Shift 2: Unleashed and Need for Speed: The Run. This license expired on 31 December 2011. In 2012 it appeared in Need For Speed: Most Wanted at second place on the Most Wanted List. The Huayra also appears in Need for Speed Rivals as a racer vehicle.
 The Huayra also appears in the Jalopnik January DLC Car Pack for Forza Motorsport 4 along with other cars like the Ford Pinto, the Alfa Romeo Montreal and seven others.  While all other cars in the pack can be purchased individually the Pagani Huayra can only be obtained by purchasing the whole pack.
 The Pagani Huayra was also featured in Asphalt 7: Heat, Asphalt 8: Airborne, Asphalt 9: Legends and in Forza Horizon Limited Edition,  as well as CSR Racing, Assetto Corsa, Gear.Club Unlimited, Project CARS and Project CARS 2. The Pagani Huayra is also featured in Real Racing 3, Grid 2 and Grid Autosport. The Huayra is also playable in the Xbox One racing game Forza Motorsport 5, the PlayStation 3 racing game Gran Turismo 6 and the PlayStation 4 racing games Driveclub and The Crew.
 A fictionalized version, branded the Pegassi Osiris, is included in the Ill Gotten Gains: Part 1 DLC update of Grand Theft Auto Online which was released on 10 June 2015.
 Keith Urban's Huayra was featured in the Jay Leno's Garage Season 5 episode, "Modern Icons".

References

External links

 Official website
 National Geographic – Supercars: Pagani Huayra (2012)

Pagani vehicles
Automobiles with gull-wing doors
Rear mid-engine, rear-wheel-drive vehicles
Roadsters
Coupés
Cars introduced in 2011
Flagship vehicles